Christian Schreiber (born 7 August 1980 in Weissenfels) is a German rower.

References
 
 

1980 births
Living people
Rowers at the 2004 Summer Olympics
Rowers at the 2008 Summer Olympics
Olympic rowers of Germany
World Rowing Championships medalists for Germany
German male rowers